Stefan Mazurkiewicz (25 September 1888 – 19 June 1945) was a Polish mathematician who worked in mathematical analysis, topology, and probability.  He was a student of Wacław Sierpiński and a member of the Polish Academy of Learning (PAU). His students included Karol Borsuk, Bronisław Knaster, Kazimierz Kuratowski, Stanisław Saks, and Antoni Zygmund.  For a time Mazurkiewicz was a professor at the University of Paris; however, he spent most of his career as a professor at the University of Warsaw.

The Hahn–Mazurkiewicz theorem, a basic result on curves prompted by the phenomenon of space-filling curves, is named for Mazurkiewicz and Hans Hahn. His 1935 paper Sur l'existence des continus indécomposables is generally considered the most elegant piece of work in point-set topology.

During the Polish–Soviet War (1919–21), Mazurkiewicz as early as 1919 broke the most common Russian cipher for the Polish General Staff's cryptological agency.  Thanks to this, orders issued by Soviet commander Mikhail Tukhachevsky's staff were known to Polish Army leaders.  This contributed substantially, perhaps decisively, to Polish victory at the critical Battle of Warsaw and possibly to Poland's survival as an independent country.

See also
 Biuro Szyfrów

External links
 
 

1888 births
1945 deaths
Warsaw School of Mathematics
People from Warsaw Governorate
Polish cryptographers
Topologists
Academic staff of the University of Paris
Academic staff of the University of Warsaw
Mathematical analysts
Cipher Bureau (Poland)
University of Warsaw alumni